Hari Budha Magar is a Nepalese double above-knee amputee and record-breaking mountaineer. In 2017, he became the first double above-knee amputee (DAK) to summit a mountain taller than 6,000m (Mera Peak, 6,476m).

Early life 
Magar was born in 1979 in a village in the foothills of the Himalayas in Nepal. He was born in a cow-shed at an altitude of 2,500m in a remote part of Western Nepal. He grew up in Mirul, in the Rolpa District of the Himalayas in Nepal. As a child, he had to walk 45 minutes each day to go to school and back, barefoot; at school, there were no pens or paper so he learnt to write with chalk stone on a wooden plank. He was forced to get married at the age of 11. During his teenage years, he was surrounded by the Nepalese Civil War where more than 17,000 people were killed over a period of 10 years.

Military career 
Magar joined the British Army via the Royal Gurkha Rifles when he was 19. He served across five continents, doing training and operations for the British Army, his roles included Combat Medic, Sniper, and Covert Surveillance, amongst other things.

Injury and recovery 

While he was serving with the British Army in Afghanistan in 2010, Magar stepped on an improvised explosive device (IED). Ultimately, he lost his legs, both above the knee, and sustained a variety of other injuries.

Since his injuries, Magar has tried a variety of sports and adventures, they include: golf, skiing, skydiving, kayaking, and rock climbing. He has also played wheelchair rugby and wheelchair basketball.

Mountaineering 
, Magar has summited Mont Blanc (4,810m), Chulu Far East (6,059m), Kilimanjaro (5,895m), and Mera Peak (6,476m). He climbed Mera Peak in 2017 and became the first double above-knee amputee to ever summit a mountain greater than 6,000m.

Plan to climb Everest 
Magar's ultimate goal, and plan, is to climb Mount Everest (8,848m), the tallest mountain in the world. In 2017, Nepal banned solo, blind, and double amputee climbers from climbing Mount Everest. Magar was already planning to climb the mountain when the news broke. He called out the ban as discriminatory and was heavily involved in campaigning  and fighting it. In 2018, after a collective effort from Hari, disability organisations and other people, the Supreme Court of Nepal overturned the ban.

As of February 2021, Magar announces an attempt to climb Mount Everest in the spring. In case of another postponement due to the COVID pandemic, the expedition will take place in 2022.

References

External links 
 Hari Budha Magar Official website

Nepalese mountain climbers
Royal Gurkha Rifles soldiers
Nepalese amputees
Living people
British Army personnel of the War in Afghanistan (2001–2021)
1979 births
People from Rolpa District